The C&C 101 is an American sailboat, that was designed by Tim Jackett and first built in 2012.

The C&C 101 was developed into the Tartan 101, another Jackett design, in 2013.

Production
The boat was built by C&C Yachts in the United States, starting in 2012, but it is now out of production.

Design
The C&C 101 is a small recreational keelboat, built predominantly of fiberglass. It has a fractional sloop, an internally-mounted spade-type rudder and a fixed fin keel. It displaces  and carries  of lead ballast.

The boat is fitted with an inboard engine.

The design has a hull speed of

See also
List of sailing boat types

Similar sailboats
Abbott 33
C&C 3/4 Ton
C&C 33
C&C SR 33
CS 33
Endeavour 33
Hunter 33
Hunter 33-2004
Hunter 33.5
Hunter 333
Hunter 336
Hunter 340
Marlow-Hunter 33
Moorings 335
Nonsuch 33
Tanzer 10
Viking 33

References

Keelboats
2010s sailboat type designs
Sailing yachts
Sailboat type designs by Tim Jackett
Sailboat types built by C&C Yachts